Tommy Amphlett (born 14 September 1988) is an English-born footballer who plays for ECU Joondalup.

Club career

Early career
Amphlett started his career in Perth with the club ECU Joondalup in the Football West Premier League.

Perth Glory
On 21 November 2009 he was signed by Perth Glory on a permanent contract after Anthony Skorich was placed on the club's long-term injury list. At the end of the 2011–12 A-League season, Amphlett was released by the club.

A-League career statistics 
(Correct as of 28 April 2012)

References

1988 births
Living people
A-League Men players
National Premier Leagues players
Association football forwards
Australian soccer players
English footballers
Perth Glory FC players
Perth RedStar FC players